Sir Charles William Dunstone  (born 21 November 1964) is the British co-founder and former chairman of mobile phone retailer Carphone Warehouse, former chairman of multinational electrical and telecommunications retailer and services company Dixons Carphone (formed on 7 August 2014 by the merger of Dixons Retail and Carphone Warehouse), and executive chairman of the TalkTalk Group.

Early life
Dunstone was born in 1964, in the town of Saffron Walden in Essex. Dunstone was educated at Uppingham School, an independent school for boys (now co-educational), in the market town of Uppingham in Rutland, in Central England. Dunstone's father was an executive at BP.

Business

Carphone Warehouse

Dunstone first began selling mobile phones out of his flat on Marylebone Road in 1989. He was 25 years old and had £6,000 of savings to start his business, having previously worked at NEC as a sales executive.

It was whilst working at NEC that he first spotted the potential of mobile phones and the future of mobile communications. At that time, handsets were large, cumbersome and mainly purchased by big business and large organisations. Corporate clients were well catered for but small businesses, the self-employed and general public had nowhere to go. Dunstone realised that mobile phones would eventually become ubiquitous and named his company The Carphone Warehouse (CPW) to serve this larger market.

In July 2000, the company floated on the London Stock Exchange and based on an Issue price of 200p, the company was valued at approximately £1.7 billion.

In 2003 Carphone Warehouse established a subsidiary TalkTalk, from the assets acquired through the purchase of Opal Telecom in 2002. TalkTalk provided homephone and broadband into the UK market. TalkTalk aggressive pricing was disruptive to the market and grew its customer base rapidly. Growth was also through acquisition, purchasing one.tel, AOL, Tele2 and lastly the Tiscali ISP businesses in the UK, this led to the demerger of TalkTalk as a separate business in March 2010.

In December 2019, Dunstone purchased £10 million worth of shares in TalkTalk, meaning he now owns 29.5% of the company's stock.

In May 2008, Best Buy, an American multinational consumer electronics corporation, and CPW agreed to create a new company, Best Buy Europe. Best Buy acquired 50% of CPW's European and US retail interests for a cash consideration of £1.1 billion or $2.1 billion. The assets of the newly formed company comprise CPW's existing retail business, operating from more than 2,400 stores in nine European countries under CPW and Phone House brands. These include the UK, Belgium, France, Germany, Ireland, The Netherlands, Portugal, Spain and Sweden.
 
CPW became the world's largest independent mobile communications retailer, but may now have lost this position.

In 2005 Dunstone's salary and bonus came to £689,000. In the Sunday Times Rich List 2006 he was listed in 64th place, with an estimated fortune of £830 million.

Dunstone employed the controversial ex-convict Ernest Saunders as a business consultant for Carphone Warehouse prior to its flotation.

HBOS
Non-executive director of HBOS PLC. HBOS is the holding company for Halifax plc and the Governor and Company of the Bank of Scotland.
In 2005 Dunstone's fee was £56,000.

The Daily Mail General Trust
non-executive director of the Daily Mail and General Trust.
DMGT is one of the largest media companies in the UK and has interests around the world in national and regional newspapers, television, radio, exhibitions and information publishing.
In 2005 Dunstone's fee was £34,000.

Independent Media Distribution PLC (now trading as Group IMD)
non-executive director of Independent Media Distribution PLC between January 2002 - May 2011
IMD is a distributor of TV & radio advertising and for the television and music industries. Clients include ITV, MTV, L'Oreal and BSkyB.
In 2005 Dunstone's fee was £20,000.

The Prince's Trust
Council Member of The Prince's Trust and former Chairman of its trading subsidiary, the Prince's Trust Trading Ltd.
The Prince's Trust is a Registered Charity (in England) No 1079675. The Prince's Trust Trading Limited (a company registered in England No 3161821) is a wholly owned subsidiary and trades on behalf of The Prince's Trust. In their 2006 annual report, The Prince's Trust had a gross income of £56.8m and an expenditure of £40.8m.

Qualifications
Dunstone has 3 A-levels, grades B,C & D. He abandoned his business degree at Liverpool University after taking a gap-year with Torch Computers in Cambridge and then with NEC.

Honours and awards
In 2005 Dunstone was awarded The Daily Telegraph's Business Person of the Year.

He was made a Knight Bachelor in the 2012 Queen's Birthday Honours List 'for services to the mobile communications industry and to charity'. In the 2015 Queen's Birthday Honours List, he was appointed Commander of the Royal Victorian Order (CVO) for his work with The Prince's Trust.

Personal life
Dunstone established a charitable trust, which is the main sponsor of the Fulwood Academy school in Preston, Lancashire.

In November 2013, the Prime Minister appointed Dunstone to the Board of Trustees of Royal Museums Greenwich. Dunstone was reappointed in 2017 but resigned in February 2021 before the end of his second term. He has donated to both the Labour and Conservative parties.

Family
Dunstone is married to Celia Gordon Shute, a public relations consultant.

Dunstone is considered a member of the Chipping Norton set. His hobbies include sailing, and he is the owner of the classic  motor yacht Shemara.

Footnotes

References
Carphone Warehouse – Board of Directors
 

1964 births
Businesspeople awarded knighthoods
Commanders of the Royal Victorian Order
Conservative Party (UK) people
Daily Mail and General Trust
English businesspeople
Knights Bachelor
Labour Party (UK) people
Living people
People educated at Uppingham School
People from Saffron Walden
TalkTalk Group people